Glenn Donald Butcher (born 1961) is an Australian actor and writer. He first came to prominence as a member of the cult Newcastle-based comedy musical troupe The Castanet Club (1982-1991), in which he played parodic lounge singer Lance Norton. Alongside Butcher, The Castanet Club featured a number of other noted performers who gained prominence in various areas of the Australian media, including Stephen Abbott (aka The Sandman), Mikey Robbins, Angela Moore (aka Shirley Purvis), Penny Biggins, actor-writer-director Warren Coleman and Maynard.

Butcher was a regular cast member of the popular TV sketch comedy series Full Frontal (1993-1997), as well as appearing in Soft Fruit, Play School and Young Einstein. Butcher starred in the 2005 television movie, Da Kath & Kim Code, the 2012 comedy, Kath & Kimderella and Fisk, starring Kitty Flanagan.

References

External links

1961 births
Australian male television actors
Australian male film actors
Living people
20th-century Australian male actors
Australian writers
Australian children's television presenters